Ricardo Torres (born 5 January 1967) is a Panamanian swimmer. He competed in three events at the 1992 Summer Olympics.

References

1967 births
Living people
Panamanian male swimmers
Olympic swimmers of Panama
Swimmers at the 1992 Summer Olympics
Place of birth missing (living people)